On Friday, May 3, 2002, a fire broke out at the Mitchell County jail in Bakersville, North Carolina. Bakersville is located northeast of Asheville, North Carolina, and has a population of less than 500. The jail, built in the 1950s, held 17 inmates; some were serving time for misdemeanors and others were awaiting trial on felonies.

Fire
Jailer Diane Greene smelled smoke and called for help around 10:05 p.m. Greene and an inmate trustee, Melissa Robinson, tried to rescue trapped inmates, but heavy smoke forced them out of the building. The jail's four cells only could be opened manually, one at a time with keys. Two deputies, Stacy Hughes and Charles Vines Jr., freed eight inmates on the ground floor, but they were not able to reach the men upstairs. By 11:30 p.m., about 100 firefighters from four counties had extinguished the fire.

Eight inmates died of smoke inhalation. Seven were trapped on the second floor, and one was in a holding cell on the ground floor. Thirteen others — nine inmates, three jail employees, and one firefighter — were injured and hospitalized.

The SBI originally classified the fire as an accident, saying it began in a storage room on the jail's ground floor when cardboard boxes stacked against a heater ignited creating heavy smoke that quickly spread through the two-story brick and wood building.

The site of the former jail has been turned into a memorial.

Victims
The men who died in the fire:
 Mark Halen Thomas, 20, was serving time for driving while impaired and driving while license revoked.
 Jeremiah Presnell, 20, was serving time for driving while license revoked and probation violation.
 Joey Grindstaff, 23, was serving time for fleeing to elude arrest.
 Jesse Allen Davis, 26, was serving time for felony breaking and entering and larceny, habitual felon, possession of a schedule IV controlled substance, possession of a controlled substance on jail premises, possession of a firearm by a felon, and assault and battery.
 Jason Boston, 27, was serving time for driving while impaired.
 Tywain Neal, 28, was serving time for felony obtaining property by false pretenses.
 Danny Johnson, 42, was serving time for felony breaking and entering, first degree kidnapping, and assault with a deadly weapon with intent to kill or inflict harm.
 Edmond Banks, 46, was serving time for driving while impaired, driving with license revoked, fleeing to elude arrest, and reckless driving.

Alleged perpetrators
The state alleges Robinson, in return for drugs and money, planned to make a smoke diversion to give way for the escape.

In a motion, the state says Robinson let Denise into the jail on May 3, 2002. In a back storeroom, Denise and Robinson piled cardboard boxes near a wall heater to make the fire look like it was sparked accidentally. They set the fire and doused the boxes with fingernail polish remover.

A date for the trial has not been set. The North Carolina State Bureau of Investigation has reopened its investigation.

Legal
Since 2007 the state has compiled 16 depositions from friends of Robinson, inmates that survived the fire, and investigators and paramedics responding to the fire.

The following tort claims from the North Carolina Department of Health and Human Resources to pay for pain and suffering incurred because of the fire have been settled:
 The Estate of Jason Boston, $400,000.
 The Estate of Mark Thomas, $325,000.
 The Estate of Jeremiah Presnell, $310,000.
 The Estate of Joey Grindstaff, $276,000.
 The Estate of Danny Johnson, $240,000.
 The Estate of Jesse Davis, $27,000.
 OM Ledford, $276,000.

Pending claims 
Some claims remain pending because the department is counterclaiming the amounts, saying Robinson conspired with Jesse Davis and his wife Denise in starting the fire. The following claims are still pending:
 Melissa Robinson, a/k/a Melissa Tipton Buchanan
 Arthur Robinson
 Patrick Mays
 Ricky Foreman

Sources
 Nowell, Paul. "N.C. Jail Fire kills eight inmates." Associated Press May 5, 2002.
 Hall, Nathan. "County veiled in sadness." Mitchell News Journal May 8, 2002.
 North Carolina Industrial Commission. Robinson v. Dept. of Health and Human Services. Civil Tort Counterclaim. March 2, 2009. Raleigh.
 New York Times "Fire Kills Eight Inmates Trapped in a North Carolina Jail" May 5, 2002, Section 1, Page 33  https://www.nytimes.com/2002/05/05/us/fire-kills-eight-inmates-trapped-in-a-north-carolina-jail.html 

Building and structure fires in the United States
2002 fires in the United States
2002 crimes in the United States
Fires in North Carolina
Mitchell County, North Carolina
2002 in North Carolina
Attacks in the United States in 2002
Residential building fires
May 2002 events in the United States
May 2002 crimes
Prison fires